Rievaulx Abbey was a Cistercian abbey in Rievaulx, near Helmsley, in the North York Moors National Park, North Yorkshire, England. It was one of the great abbeys in England until it was seized in 1538 under Henry VIII during the Dissolution of the Monasteries. The wider site was awarded Scheduled Ancient Monument status in 1915 and the abbey was brought into the care of the then Ministry of Works in 1917. The striking ruins of its main buildings are today a tourist attraction, owned and maintained by English Heritage.

Foundation

Rievaulx Abbey was the first Cistercian monastery in the north of England, founded in 1132 by twelve monks from Clairvaux Abbey.

Its remote location was well suited to the order's ideal of a strict life of prayer and self-sufficiency with little contact with the outside world. The abbey's patron, Walter Espec, also founded another Cistercian community, that of Wardon Abbey in Bedfordshire, on unprofitable wasteland on one of his inherited estates.

William I, the first abbot of Rievaulx, started construction in the 1130s. The second abbot, Saint Aelred of Rievaulx, expanded the buildings and otherwise consolidated the existence of what in time became one of the great Cistercian abbeys of Yorkshire,  with Fountains Abbey the second only Cistercian house to be built in Yorkshire. Under Aelred the abbey is said to have grown to some 140 monks and 500 lay brothers. By the end of his tenure Rievaulx had five daughter houses in England and Scotland.

Financial prosperity
The abbey lies in a wooded dale by the River Rye, sheltered by hills. The monks diverted part of the river several yards to the west in order to have enough flat land to build on. They altered the course of the river twice more during the 12th century. The old course is visible in the grounds of the abbey. This is an illustration of the technical ingenuity of the monks, who over time built up a profitable business mining lead and iron ore, rearing sheep and selling wool to buyers from all over Europe. Rievaulx Abbey became one of the greatest and wealthiest in England, with 140 monks and many more lay brothers. It received grants of land totalling 6,000 acres (24 km2) and established daughter houses in England and Scotland.

By the end of the 13th century the abbey had incurred debts on its building projects and lost revenue owing to an epidemic of sheep scab (psoroptic mange). The ill fortune was compounded by raiders from Scotland in the early 14th century. The great reduction in population caused by the Black Death in the mid-14th century made it difficult to recruit new lay brothers for manual labour. As a result the abbey was forced to lease much of its land. By 1381 there were only fourteen choir monks, three lay brothers and the abbot left at Rievaulx, and some buildings were reduced in size.

By the 15th century the Cistercian practices of strict observance according to the Rule of Saint Benedict had been abandoned in favour of a more comfortable lifestyle. The monks were permitted to eat meat, more private living accommodation was created for them and the abbot had a substantial private household in what had once been the infirmary.

Dissolution

The abbey was a troubling one for the authorities. Edward Cowper led the monks beginning in 1530, but the monks objected to his style. He was ejected in 1533 and initially the monks refused a replacement.

At the time of its dissolution in 1538 the abbey was said to consist of 72 buildings occupied by the abbot and 21 monks, with 102 lay employees and an income of £351 a year. The abbey owned a prototype blast furnace at Laskill, producing cast iron as efficiently as a modern blast furnace.

As was standard procedure, the confiscated monastic buildings were rendered uninhabitable and stripped of valuables such as lead. The site was granted to Thomas Manners, 1st Earl of Rutland, one of Henry's advisers, until it passed to the Duncombe family.

Post monastic era 
In the later 16th and 17th centuries Rievaulx was an important iron-manufacturing site.

In the 1750s the then owner, Thomas Duncombe III, beautified his estate by building a terraced walk along the valley top overlooking the abbey from where the picturesque qualities of the ruins and the wider landscape could be enjoyed. It features two Grecian-style temples. They are in the care of the National Trust. The abbey ruins are in the care of English Heritage.

In the 20th century the abbey became a much-visited historic monument in the care of the State and is now managed by the English Heritage Trust.

In 2015 Historic England commissioned an archaeological survey and investigation of the abbey precinct using low-level aerial photography to make a digital surface model and an earthwork plan. This was followed by a ground-based survey in 2018. The aim of the project was to develop a better understanding of the landscape surrounding the abbey and was published in 2019.

When awarded a life peerage in 1983, former prime minister Harold Wilson, a Yorkshireman, adopted the title Baron Wilson of Rievaulx.

Burials
Aelred of Rievaulx
Thomas de Ros, 4th Baron de Ros
John de Ros, 5th Baron de Ros

Gallery

See also
Abbot of Rievaulx
List of monastic houses in North Yorkshire

References

Sources

External links

Official English Heritage site
Catholic Encyclopedia article

Christian monasteries established in the 12th century
Churches in North Yorkshire
Cistercian monasteries in England
English Heritage sites in North Yorkshire
History of North Yorkshire
Monasteries in North Yorkshire
Religious organizations established in the 1130s
Ruins in North Yorkshire
Tourist attractions in North Yorkshire
1132 establishments in England
1538 disestablishments in England
Ruined abbeys and monasteries
Monasteries dissolved under the English Reformation